Airline and airport management is the administration of airports and airlines. It includes the activities of setting the strategy of airports to gather and provide information on airline commercial and operational priorities. It covers a broad overview of the airline management. It is also studied as a branch of study that teaches management of airport and airlines. This provides a broad overview of the airline industry and creates awareness of the underlying marketing, financial, operational, and other factors influencing airline management. This study provides information on airline commercial and operational priorities, along with teaching the key characteristics of aircraft selection and the impact of airport decision-making.

Overview

Aviation trends 
The global airline industry continues to grow rapidly, but consistent and robust profitability is elusive. Measured by revenue, the industry has doubled over the past decade, from US$369 billion in 2004 to a projected $746 billion in 2014, according to the International Air Transport Association (IATA).

Much of the growth of aviation has been driven by low-cost carriers (LCCs), which now control some 25 percent of the worldwide market and have been expanding operations  rapidly in emerging markets; growth also came from continued gains by carriers in developed markets, the IATA reported. Yet profit margins are still low, at less than 3 percent overall.

In the commercial aviation sector, just about every group in the aviation industry chain—airports, airplane manufacturers, jet engine makers, travel agents, and service companies, to name a few—turns a profit. However, airline companies whose primary focus is on passenger flights have great difficulty making a profit 

This is due to the complex nature of the business, manifested in part by the significant degree of regulation (which minimizes consolidation), and the vulnerability of airlines to outside events that happen regularly, such as security concerns and volcanic eruptions. Ongoing price pressure is also a factor; the airline industry is one of the few sectors that has seen prices fall for decades. Since the 1950s, airline fares (defined as the average fare paid by a passenger per kilometer) have consistently dropped.

Given these circumstances, airlines must continue to focus on top-line growth because their limited profitability depends almost solely on revenue gains. They must also increase productivity in order to shore up and perhaps even increase margins. The way individual commercial airlines react to and navigate several trends playing out across the globe will determine carrier performance in the coming years.

Marketing 
Marketing is another critical factor in managing an airline company. It is one vital way to inform the public about the airline company.

References

Further reading 
 
 
 

Management by type
Airlines